Fritz K. Mueller (1907 – 2001 Huntsville, Alabama, USA) was a German engineer.

Mueller was hired by Kreiselgeräte Company in 1933. He developed the PIGA accelerometer. and worked on gyroscopes for Nazi Germany's Kriegsmarine. Later on, he worked on the guidance and control system for the A3 test rocket, the A5, and the A4 (V-2) ballistic missile.

Under Project Paperclip, Mueller emigrated to the United States on 16 November 1945 with the Argentina group. There, he worked on developing guidance systems for the PGM-11 Redstone, PGM-19 Jupiter, MGM-31 Pershing, and the Saturn I missiles.
In 1960 Mueller left NASA for private industry.

References

1907 births
2001 deaths
Early spaceflight scientists
German aerospace engineers
German emigrants to the United States
German spaceflight pioneers
Operation Paperclip